Glochidion tomentosum is a species of plant in the family Phyllanthaceae. It is native to Karnataka and Tamil Nadu in India.

References

tomentosum
Flora of Karnataka
Flora of Tamil Nadu
Endangered plants
Taxonomy articles created by Polbot